General Singh may refer to:

A. K. Singh (born 1953), Indian Army general
Ajai Singh (lieutenant general) (fl. 1980s–2020s), Indian Army lieutenant general
Ajai Singh (born 1934), Indian Army lieutenant general
Akali Phula Singh (1761–1823), Sikh Khalsa Army senior general
Baj Singh (died 1716), Sikh general
Bhopinder Singh (born 1946), Indian Army general
Bikram Singh (lieutenant general) (1911–1963), Indian Army lieutenant general
Bikram Singh (general) (born 1952), Indian Army general
Dalvir Singh (born 1946), Indian Army major general
Depinder Singh (born 1930), Indian Army lieutenant general
Hanut Singh (soldier) (1933–2015), Indian Army lieutenant general
Harbaksh Singh (1913–1999), Indian Army lieutenant general
Harinder Singh (general) (fl. 1980s–2020s), Indian Army lieutenant general
Harkirat Singh (general) (fl. 1980s), Indian Army major general
J. J. Singh (born 1945), Indian Army general
Kamal Jit Singh (fl. 1970s–2010s), Indian Army lieutenant general
Kanwar Bahadur Singh (1910–2007), Indian Army lieutenant general
Kanwar Zorawar Singh (1920–1994), Indian Army major general
Khem Karan Singh (1921–2016), Indian Army lieutenant general
Konsam Himalay Singh (fl. 1970s–2010s), Indian Army lieutenant general
Kulwant Singh (general) (born 1939), Indian Army major general
Linda L. Singh (fl. 1980s–2000s), Maryland Army National Guard major general
Man Mohan Singh Rai (fl. 1970s–2010s), Indian Army lieutenant general
Manjinder Singh (general) (fl. 1980s–2020s), Indian Army lieutenant general
Mohan Singh (general) (fl. 1909–1989), Indian National Army general
Ranbir Singh (general) (fl. 1980–2020s), Indian Army lieutenant general
Ravendra Pal Singh (fl. 1980–2020s), Indian Army lieutenant general
S. K. Singh (general) (fl. 1970–2010s), Indian Army lieutenant general
Sagat Singh (1919–2001), Indian Army lieutenant general
Sardar Chuhar Singh (born c. 1743), Shaheedan Misl general
Sartaj Singh (general) (died 1998), Indian Army lieutenant general
Shabeg Singh (1925–1984), Indian Army major general
Surinder Singh (general) (fl. 1970s–2010s), Indian Army lieutenant general
Taranjit Singh (general) (fl. 1980s–2020s), Indian Army lieutenant general
V. K. Singh (born 1951), Indian Army four-star

See also
Attorney General Singh (disambiguation)